Gustave F. Perna (born 1960) is a retired United States Army four-star general who last served as the chief operating officer of the federal COVID-19 response for vaccine and therapeutics. He previously served as the chief operating officer of Operation Warp Speed from July 2020 until the operation's duties and responsibilities were transferred to the White House COVID-19 Response Team in February 2021. As chief operating officer of COVID-19 response, he oversaw the logistics in the United States federal government's distribution of the vaccine to the COVID-19 pandemic. The Senate confirmed his nomination as chief operating officer on July 2, 2020, and he assumed the office shortly after.

Perna previously served as the 19th commanding general of United States Army Materiel Command from September 30, 2016 to July 2, 2020. He also served for two years as the Army's Deputy Chief of Staff, G-4, overseeing policies and procedures used by all United States Army logistic personnel throughout the world. Prior to joining the Army staff he served for two years as Deputy Chief of Staff, G-3/4, United States Army Materiel Command.

Perna retired from the Army on July 2, 2021 after over 40 years of service.

Early life and education
Perna is a New Jersey native who attended Morris Hills High School, before graduating from Valley Forge Military Academy and College with an associate degree in business administration. Graduating as a Distinguished Military Graduate, he was commissioned as a second lieutenant, infantry officer in 1981 via the Early Commissioning Program from Valley Forge. He earned a bachelor's degree in business management from the University of Maryland and a master's degree in logistics management from the Florida Institute of Technology (1992). His military education includes: Infantry Officer Basic Course, Ordnance Officer Advanced Course, Logistics Executive Development Course, Support Operations Course, Command and General Staff College and Senior Service College.

Military career
Perna's command assignments include:
 Commander, Joint Munitions Command and Joint Munitions and Lethality Lifecycle Management Command, responsible for the lifecycle management of $40 billion of conventional ammunition
 Commander, Defense Supply Center Philadelphia, Defense Logistics Agency, responsible for the procurement of more than $14.5 billion worth of food, clothing, textiles, medicines, medical supplies, construction and equipment items for America's Warfighters and other customers worldwide
 Commander, 4th Sustainment Brigade, where he deployed the brigade to combat operations during Operation Iraqi Freedom 05-07
 Commander, 64th Forward Support Battalion, 3rd Brigade, 4th Infantry Division, Fort Carson, Colorado, where he deployed the battalion to combat operations during Operation Iraqi Freedom I;
 Deputy Commanding Officer, 64th Corps Support Group, 13th Corps Support Command (COSCOM), Fort Hood, Texas
 Commander, B Company, 143rd Ordnance Battalion, Aberdeen Proving Ground, Maryland

Perna's staff assignments include:
 Director of Logistics, J4, U.S. Forces-Iraq, responsible for sustainment plans and policies for strategic and operational logistics to sustain coalition and joint forces
 Executive Officer to the Director of the DLA, supporting the Director's mission of providing Army, Navy, Air Force, Marine Corps and other federal agencies with logistics, acquisitions and technical services support
 Ordnance Branch Chief, Human Resources Command
 Division Support Command (DISCOM) Executive Officer and G4, 1st Cavalry Division, where he deployed to Bosnia
 544th Maintenance Battalion Support Operations Officer and Battalion Executive Officer, 13th COSCOM
 G4 Maintenance Officer, 13th COSCOM, where he deployed to Somalia as a member of Joint Task Force Support Command

Perna's nomination for promotion to commanding general of the United States Army Materiel Command (AMC) was confirmed by the United States Senate on September 15, 2016. He assumed command on September 30, 2016. In March 2020, his deputy Lieutenant General Edward M. Daly was confirmed as his successor at AMC. In May 2020, Perna was named Chief Operating Officer (COO) of the White House's Operation Warp Speed effort to quickly develop a COVID-19 vaccine. In June 2020, he was nominated to continue serving as an Army general in the position of COO, and was confirmed the next month by the Senate.

After retirement 
According to Politico's "National Security Daily" newsletter of 27 October 2022, "Retired Gen. GUSTAVE PERNA will serve as chief operating officer of DEFCON AI, a startup that will bring artificial intelligence to defense logistics."

Awards and decorations
Perna's military awards include:

References

External links

 Gustave F. Perna at U.S. Army Materiel Command
 

1960 births
Living people
COVID-19 pandemic in the United States
Florida Institute of Technology alumni
Recipients of the Defense Superior Service Medal
Recipients of the Distinguished Service Medal (US Army)
Recipients of the Legion of Merit
United States Army generals
University System of Maryland alumni
Valley Forge Military Academy and College alumni